Chrysochroa fulgidissima, "jewel beetle" or Yamato tamamushi in Japanese (ヤマトタマムシ) is a metallic woodboring beetle of the family Buprestidae.

Characteristics

This beetle is native to Japan and Korea.

The Tamamushi Shrine, an Asuka Period miniature shrine located at Hōryū-ji Temple, Nara prefecture, was decorated with lacquer and oil painting on wood, gilt bronze plaques, and with beetlewing work using the iridescent wings of the Chrysochroa fulgidissima beetle.

Tamamushi-iro
Since this insect has iridescent wings that glow lengthwise with different colors depending upon the light angle, one cannot be sure exactly which color it is. Therefore, it gave rise to the expression tamamushi-iro (tamamushi color), in reference to a convoluted statement that can be interpreted in more ways than one.

The term tamamushi-iro is used in the context of Japanese officialdom, when politicians or bureaucrats use language that is ambiguous.

See also
Beetlewing

Notes

References

Beetles of Asia
Insects of Japan
Buprestidae
Woodboring beetles
Beetles described in 1817

ja:タマムシ#ヤマトタマムシ